Elizabeth Lake is a lake in Kenosha County, Wisconsin and McHenry County, Illinois.

Elizabeth Lake was named for Elizabeth Barrett Browning, an English poet.

See also
List of lakes in Illinois
List of lakes in Wisconsin

References

Lakes of Illinois
Bodies of water of McHenry County, Illinois
Lakes of Kenosha County, Wisconsin
Lakes of Wisconsin